Smolyansky is a Slavic surname. Notable people with the surname include:

 Julie Smolyansky (born 1975), American businesswoman
 Michael Smolyansky (1947–2002), American businessman, father of Julie

See also
 David Smolansky

Slavic-language surnames
Jewish surnames